Mythologiques is a four-volume work of cultural anthropology by Claude Lévi-Strauss. Originally written in French, the works were translated into English by John and Doreen Weightman.

The four volumes of Mythologiques are: 
 The Raw and the Cooked - First published 1964. Translated in 1969
From Honey to Ashes - First published in 1966. Translated in 1973
The Origin of Table Manners - First published in 1968. Translated in 1978
The Naked Man - First published in 1971. Translated in 1981.

References 

Works by Claude Lévi-Strauss
French books
Mythology books
Anthropology books